The 1997–98 Segunda División season saw 22 teams participate in the second flight Spanish league. Deportivo Alavés, CF Extremadura and Villarreal CF were promoted to Primera División. Elche CF, Real Jaén, Xerez CD and Levante UD were relegated to Segunda División B.

The league was expanded to 22 teams due to reduction of Primera División to 20 teams.

Teams 

 Leganés played their matches at Municipal de Butarque from February 14'th, 1998.

Teams by Autonomous Community

Final table

Results

Promotion playoff

First Leg

Second Leg 

Segunda División seasons
2
Spain